Giovanni Gambacorta, C.R. (1613 – 25 May 1683) was a Roman Catholic prelate who served as Bishop of Marsico Nuovo (1676–1683).

Biography
Giovanni Gambacorta was born in Limatola, Italy and ordained a priest in the Congregation of Clerics Regular of the Divine Providence.

On 23 March 1676, he was appointed during the papacy of Pope Clement X as Bishop of Marsico Nuovo.
On 26 April 1676, he was consecrated bishop by Camillo Massimi, Cardinal-Priest of Sant'Eusebio, and Egidio Colonna (patriarch), Titular Patriarch of Jerusalem, and Angelo della Noca, Archbishop Emeritus of Rossano, serving as co-consecrators. 
He served as Bishop of Marsico Nuovo until his death on 25 May 1683.

References

External links and additional sources
 (for Chronology of Bishops) (for Chronology of Bishops) 
 (for Chronology of Bishops) (for Chronology of Bishops) 

17th-century Italian Roman Catholic bishops
Bishops appointed by Pope Clement X
1613 births
1683 deaths
Theatine bishops
People from the Province of Benevento